Xhariep is one of the 5 districts of Free State province of South Africa.The District is the largest in the Free State Geographically and is known for its vast land. The District is home to the largest dam in the Country, the Gariep Dam and has two mines,situated in Jagersfontein and  Koffifontein. The natural resources and the geographical position of the District make it a site with the best potential for investment and  development. Xhariep has prominent towns such as Rouxville. The seat of Xhariep is Trompsburg. The largest language group is Sotho who make up 45.3% of the total population of 146,259 (2011 Census). The district code is DC16.

Geography

Neighbours
Xhariep is surrounded by:
 Lejweleputswa to the north (DC18)
 Mangaung Metro to the north-east
 The kingdom of Lesotho to the east
 Joe Gqabi District in Eastern Cape to the south (DC14)
 Pixley ka Seme in Northern Cape to the west (DC7)
 Frances Baard in Northern Cape to the north-west (DC9)

Local municipalities
The district contains the following local municipalities:

Demographics
The following statistics are from the 2011 census.

Gender

Ethnic groups

Age

Politics

Election results
Election results for Xhariep in the South African general election, 2004. 
 Population 18 and over: 82 604 [61.07% of total population]
 Total votes: 43 082 [31.85% of total population]
 Voting % estimate: 52.15% votes as a % of population 18 and over

References

External links
 Xhariep DM Official Website

District municipalities of the Free State (province)
Xhariep District Municipality